The Clan of the Cave Bear is a 1986 American adventure film directed by Michael Chapman and based on the book of the same name by Jean M. Auel. The film stars Daryl Hannah, Pamela Reed, James Remar, and Thomas G. Waites.

Based on the novel of the same name, a young Cro-Magnon woman named Ayla (Daryl Hannah) is separated from her family and orphaned during an earthquake. She is found by a group of Neanderthals and raised as one of their own. As the years go by, her own intelligence causes disaster for the entire tribe, especially its future chief, Broud (Thomas G. Waites).

Dialogue is conducted mostly through a form of sign language which is translated for the audience with subtitles.

Plot
After losing her mother in an earthquake in Paleolithic Europe, 5-year-old Cro-Magnon Ayla (Emma Floria) is left alone in the woods. She then 
suffers a severe injury to her legs from a nearby cave lion. After suffering from starvation, exhaustion, and infection of her wounds, she collapses, on the verge of death. She is rescued by Iza (Pamela Reed), the healer of a group of Neanderthals who call themselves "The Clan", against the orders for her to be left to die by the clan's chief, Brun (John Doolittle), because she is clearly a member of "the Others", the distrusted antagonists of the Clan. Brun refuses to accept Ayla when Iza adopts her, only allowing her to stay with the Clan because Iza refuses to abandon her. The Clan calls her "Ayla", the closest they can come to pronouncing her birth name.

Through meditation, Iza's brother, Creb (the group's shaman), comes to believe that the child may be protected by the spirit of the cave lion, a powerful "totem" that is never given to a woman and very few men. He cites the cave lion attack the girl experienced shortly before being discovered as proof that its spirit marked her so that she could be adopted into the Clan. After traveling with them for a while and starting to heal, Ayla wanders away from the group when they stop to discuss what they should do and she discovers a huge, beautiful cave, perfect for their needs; many of the people begin to regard Ayla as lucky, especially since good fortune continues to come their way as they begin to accept her in the fold.

Ayla's different thought processes lead her to break important Clan customs, particularly the taboo against females handling weapons. She is self-willed and spirited, but tries hard to fit in with the Neanderthals, although she has to learn everything first-hand; she does not possess the ancestral memories of the Clan which enable them to do certain tasks after being shown only once.

Iza trains Ayla as a medicine woman "of her line", the most prestigious line of medicine women out of all of the Clans. It takes her much longer to train Ayla than it will her own daughter, Uba (Lycia Naff), since Ayla does not possess the memories of the Clan. Iza is concerned that when Ayla grows up nobody will want her as their mate, making her a burden to the Clan. So she trains Ayla to be a highly respected medicine woman who will have her own "status" and will not have to rely on the status of a mate.

Meanwhile, Broud (Joey Cramer), the son of Brun, disdains Ayla and when they both reach adulthood, Broud (Thomas G. Waites) brutally rapes Ayla (Daryl Hannah) in an impulsive bid to demonstrate his control over her. Broud continues to assault Ayla multiple times daily leaving her despondent, and she soon becomes pregnant. Iza explains to Ayla that her unusual appearance compared to the rest of the Clan will likely preclude her from obtaining a mate before she gives birth, a circumstance Iza's people believe will bring bad luck to their settlement. Ayla witnesses Broud trying to master a sling with no success, she then takes it and soon becomes skilled with it. The clan are then attacked by a pack of wolves and Ayla saves a child from being killed with the slingshot, the clan then decide to banish her from their settlement, she finds shelter in another cave. Following a difficult pregnancy and a near-fatal labor, Ayla rejoices in the birth of a son but, due to his appearance being an amalgamation of Clan and Other features, he is considered deformed and almost taken away from her, but because she has proven to have survived on her own and be a skilled hunter, she is allowed to keep him, and is given the name Durc.

After Iza's death, Broud is named chief by Brun. Broud's first order is to take Ayla for himself and separate her from her son, giving him to another couple, and he also exiles the already elderly Creb as there's another shaman in charge. Ayla opposes and fights Broud, defeating him. Thus a humiliated Broud agrees to keep Creb with the clan, but Ayla still chooses to leave, saying goodbye to her son, in search of her own people.

Cast

 Daryl Hannah as Ayla
 Pamela Reed as Iza
 James Remar as Creb
 Thomas G. Waites as Broud
 John Doolittle as Brun
 Curtis Armstrong as Goov
 Martin Doyle as Grod
 Tony Montanaro as Zoug
 Mike Muscat as Dorv
 Karen Elizabeth Austin as Aba
 Janne Mortil as Ovra
 Lycia Naff as Uba
 Penny Smith as Ika
 Rory Crowley as Durc
 Joey Cramer as young Broud
 Nicole Eggert as Teen Ayla
 Paul Carafotes as Brug
 Bart the Bear as the cave bear
 Emma Floria as Young Ayla
 Mary Reid as Ayla's Mother

Production
Producer Gerald Isenberg originally conceived the film as a television film but was rejected by NBC. The film was shot in western Canada, primarily in British Columbia, between June and October 1984 with a budget of $16 million. It was filmed in the Regional District of Okanagan-Similkameen, a precursor to the many Hollywood productions that would film in Canada soon after (see Hollywood North and Cinema of Canada). It was also filmed at Cathedral and MacMillan Provincial Park, at the Nahanni National Park Reserve in the Northwest Territories, and in the Yukon Territory. The score was composed by Alan Silvestri. This film is one of Bart the Bear's earliest roles. He was partly replaced by an animatronic bear designed by Stan Winston. The muskox hunt was filmed just outside Hughenden, Alberta. The actors had to film scenes in mountains with minimal clothing of animal pelts in temperatures as low as 5 degrees Fahrenheit, while the makeup for actors portraying Neanderthals took 3.5 hours to apply. The animals were trained by professional employees from Heber City, Utah's Wasatch Rocky Mountain Wildlife, Thousand Oaks, California's Animal Actors of Hollywood and Frazier Park, California's Working Wildlife.

Box office and reception
Due to the production budget of US$15 million earning back only US$1.9 million, domestically, the film was unanimously considered a box-office bomb. Still, two makeup artists (Michael Westmore and Michèle Burke) were nominated for a 1987 Oscar for Best Makeup. 

The film holds a 10% rating on Rotten Tomatoes, based on ten reviews. However, The Encyclopedia of Fantasy claims: "It is hard to see why 'TCOTCB' has drawn such critical contempt, unless for its tacit feminism: although the narration is overexpository and the equation of mental versatility with leggy blonde Cro-Magnons, as opposed to shabby Neanderthals, is a cliché, the movie is beautifully shot, well scripted and finely acted."

Colin Greenland reviewed The Clan of the Cave Bear, for White Dwarf #77, and stated that "Now there's a movie starring Daryl Hannah, whom I still like a lot, though she doesn't stand a chance amid all the picture-postcard photography, tacky mysticism and shaggy-browed sentimentality. But Ayla is unafraid, for she knows there are five more books to go yet."

See also
The Clan of the Cave Bear
Quest for Fire (film)
List of historical drama films

References

External links

The Clan of the Cave Bear article on The Encyclopedia of Fantasy (1997), archived at The Encyclopedia of Science Fiction website

1980s fantasy adventure films
1986 films
American fantasy adventure films
Fictional-language films
Films about cavemen
Films based on American novels
Films directed by Michael Chapman
Films scored by Alan Silvestri
Films set in prehistory
Warner Bros. films
Earth's Children
Fiction about neanderthals
Films about bears
Films with screenplays by John Sayles
Films shot in British Columbia
Films shot in the Northwest Territories
Films shot in Yukon
Films shot in Alberta
Films set in Europe
1980s English-language films
1980s American films